The AACTA Award for Best Young Actor is an award presented by the Australian Academy of Cinema and Television Arts (AACTA), a non-profit organisation whose aim is to "identify, award, promote and celebrate Australia's greatest achievements in film and television." The award is presented at the annual AACTA Awards, which hand out accolades for achievements in feature film, television, documentaries and short films. From 1991 to 2010, the category was presented by the Australian Film Institute (AFI), the Academy's parent organisation, at the annual Australian Film Institute Awards (known as the AFI Awards). When the AFI launched the Academy in 2011, it changed the annual ceremony to the AACTA Awards, with the current award being a continuum of the AFI Young Actors Award.

The award was first presented in 1991 as "Best Juvenile Performance", and from 1992 to 2010, it was known as the "Young Actors Award". It was handed out as a special award from 1991 to 2001, before it became a competitive award from 2002, onwards. Additionally, a cash prize of A$20,000 was given to the winner from 2006 to 2008.

The award is presented at the discretion of the Academy, and is eligible to an actor or actress who is under the age of eighteen. It is given to an individual who has performed in a lead, supporting or guest role of television, feature film and short film categories.

Winners and nominees
In the following table, the years listed correspond to the year of film release; the ceremonies are usually held the same year. The performer in bold and in dark blue background have received a special award; those in bold and in yellow background have won a regular competitive award. Those that are neither highlighted nor in bold are the nominees. When sorted chronologically, the table always lists the winning performer first and then the other nominees.

Notes

A: From 1958 to 2010, the awards were held during the year of the films release. However, the 1974–75 awards were held in 1975 for films released in 1974 and 1975, and the first AACTA Awards were held in 2012 for films released in 2011.

See also
AACTA Awards
Australian Film Institute

References

External links
The Australian Academy of Cinema and Television Arts Official website

Awards established in 1991
Young Actor
Awards for young actors
1991 establishments in Australia